The .50-90 Sharps rifle cartridge is a black-powder cartridge that was introduced by Sharps Rifle Manufacturing Company in 1872 as a buffalo (American bison) hunting round.  Like other large black-powder rounds, it incorporates a heavy bullet and a large powder volume, leading to high muzzle energies.

Specifications 
The standard factory loads, produced and sold by the Sharps Rifle Manufacturing Company and the Sharps Rifle Company were .50/100/425 (.50 caliber/100 grains black powder/425 grain grease grooved bullet) and .50/100/473 with a paper patched bullet.  Factory loads manufactured by any of the Sharps companies were mostly hand-loaded which made them expensive to produce.  This naturally invited competition.  Winchester offered the cartridge loaded .50/90/473 with paper patched bullets which may be how the cartridge came to be commonly known as the .50-90.  The .50-90 Sharps is similar to the .50-100 Sharps and .50-110 Sharps cartridges.  All three use the same  case, the latter two being loaded with more grains of black powder. All rifles made for the .50-90 Sharps should be able to use the .50-110 and .50-100 cartridges due to the case dimensions being nearly identical.

Bullet diameter was typically  diameter. Historical loads using black powder have muzzle energy in the  range, while modern loads using smokeless powder give  of energy.

History 

The buffalo is a large animal and difficult to take down reliably, which has led to a demand for cartridges designed specifically for buffalo hunting. The .50-90 was created with this purpose in mind.  As a result, the cartridge became immediately popular with the professional buffalo hunters on the Western plains.  At the time of its invention, there were no special powders or bullet types, and the knowledge of ballistics was fairly limited.  Thus, when trying to create a more effective big game cartridge, the designers simply expanded the dimensions of prior cartridges.

Billy Dixon used a Sharps .50-90 at the Second Battle of Adobe Walls on June 27, 1874, to make his legendary 1,538-yard shot.

Today the round is obsolete. Ammunition is no longer mass-produced by any manufacturer except Buffalo Arms. Brass and bullets are produced, but loaded ammunition must either come from a custom shop or be handloaded. Rifles are produced only as semi-custom by a few companies.  Rifles in this caliber are typically used for buffalo hunting and reenactments. Occasionally .50-90 rifles are used for vintage competitions, but the commercial availability of other contemporary cartridges such as the .45-70, much more popular than the .50-90.

See also
 Table of handgun and rifle cartridges

References

50-90 Sharps
Sharps cartridges